Ahmed Guilouzi (born 6 March 1987) is a Tunisian footballer who played in Serie B in Italy. Besides Italy, he has played in Croatia.

Club career
Guilouzi made his professional debut for Modena as a second-half substitute in a league match at Vicenza on 28 October 2008.

In August 2010 he was loaned to Carpi.

In the summer of 2011 he moved to Cesena, but soon, in late August, he found himself transferred to the Croatian club NK Zagreb, signing a deal with them until June 2014. Not getting a single cap for the first team in his first four months at the club, he was loaned to HNK Gorica in January 2012 until summer.

References

External links
 
 
https://archive.today/20130217202822/http://www.zns.hr/vijesti/52-slubeno-glasilo-2011/786-nogomet-br-25.html

1987 births
Living people
Tunisian footballers
Tunisian expatriate footballers
Serie B players
Modena F.C. players
A.C. Carpi players
NK Zagreb players
HNK Gorica players
Expatriate footballers in Italy
Expatriate footballers in Croatia
Association football central defenders
P.D. Castellarano players